Maid abuse is the maltreatment or neglect of a person hired as a domestic worker, especially by the employer or by a household member of the employer. It is any act or failure to act that results in harm to that employee. It takes on numerous forms, including physical, sexual, emotional, and economic abuse. The majority of perpetrators tend to be female employers and their children. These acts may be committed for a variety of reasons, including to instil fear in the victim, discipline them, or act in a way desired by the abuser.

The United States Human Trafficking Hotline describes maid abuse as a form of human trafficking— it is "force, fraud, or coercion to maintain control over the worker and to cause the worker to believe that he or she has no other choice but to continue with the work," they stated. Although it can occur anywhere, it is most commonly experienced amongst domestic workers in Singapore.

Prevalence 
Maid abuse, though a global phenomenon, is especially prevalent in Singapore.  According to a study by Research Across Borders, six out of ten Singaporean domestic workers experience some form of abuse at work. One in four reported physical violence.  Additionally, one in seven Singaporeans have witnessed maid abuse.

Foreign domestic workers, who have come to the country seeking employment, are at high risk of abuse. As maids are the only migrant workers not protected under the country's Singapore's Employment Act, many end up in abusive situations. This is amplified due to the fact that foreign domestic worker contracts in Singapore lack live-out options; foreign maids reside in the same residence as their employers. Mistreatment of Singaporean foreign domestic workers is not uncommon and is widely detailed. They are subject to physical abuse, invasion of privacy, and sexual assault (including rape).

Legislation

Singapore 
In Singapore, it is against the law to abuse a foreign domestic worker. The Ministry of Manpower (MOM) says that perpetrators face severe penalties; if convicted, the perpetrator may face prison time, caning, or be fined as much as $20,000 (USD). The perpetrator will also be banned from further employment of foreign domestic workers.

Malaysia 
In Malaysia, abused foreign domestic workers can obtain visas so that they may stay in the country to pursue legal complaints; the same is true in the United States.

Notable cases 

 On 2 December 2001,19-year-old Indonesian maid Muawanatul Chasanah was found beaten to death in her house of employment in Chai Chee, Singapore. Her employer, Ng Hua Chye, was arrested and charged with her murder. It was revealed in Ng's 2-day trial that Ng had repeatedly punched, kicked and whipped the maid and even used burning cigarette butts and/or boiling hot water to burn the maid due to her supposed poor working performance and her stealing the food of Ng's infant daughter. He was sentenced to 18 years and six months in prison, along with 12 strokes of the cane.
 On 28 May 2002, Indonesian maid Sundarti Supriyanto killed her employer Angie Ng and Ng's daughter Crystal Poh, and set fire on Ng's Bukit Merah office in Singapore. Sundarti recounted that she was severely abused by Ng for minor mistakes, and even starved for days by Ng. It made her endured too much humiliation until she finally lost her control and fatally stabbed Ng (and her daughter) in a frenzied attack. The High Court of Singapore accepted that she indeed suffered from maid abuse and was not of her right mind when she was gravely provoked into committing the crime and lost control; therefore they acquitted Sundarti of murder and instead sentenced her to life imprisonment for culpable homicide not amounting to murder.
 On 26 July 2016, in Singapore, Myanmar maid Piang Ngaih Don was killed by her employer, 41-year-old Gaiyathiri Murugayan. Murugayan was sentenced to 30 years in prison on 22 June 2021. She had earlier pleaded guilty to 28 charges out of a total of 115 relating to the murder and abuse of the maid, who worked for her family for a few months. The murder charge was reduced to the next highest charge of culpable homicide as Gaiyathiri was suffering from a mental disorder at the time she murdered Piang, meaning she would not be sentenced to death (which was the mandatory penalty for murder in Singapore). The prosecution sought a life sentence for the convicted maid killer, and while judge See Kee Oon did not hand out a life term, he agreed by saying that the conduct of Gaiyathiri were an abhorrence and outrage to human and public conscience. Gaiyathiri's mother (also charged with murder) and husband, who also abused the maid, were pending trial as of July 2021.
 On 06 Dec 2021, Aye Aye Naing, a maid from Myanmar, was sentenced to 30 weeks' jail for abusing her elderly employer over a period of seven months, who was also bedridden.

See also 

 Domestic worker

References 

Abuse
Crimes
Violence against women